Transportes Puertas de Cuyo is an Argentinian UCI Continental cycling team founded in 2017.

Team roster

References

External links

UCI Continental Teams (America)
Cycling teams established in 2017
Cycling teams based in Argentina
2017 establishments in Argentina